Boštjan Fridrih (born 20 September 1979) is a Slovenian sprinter. He competed in the men's 4 × 100 metres relay at the 2000 Summer Olympics.

References

1979 births
Living people
Athletes (track and field) at the 2000 Summer Olympics
Slovenian male sprinters
Olympic athletes of Slovenia
Place of birth missing (living people)
Mediterranean Games bronze medalists for Slovenia
Mediterranean Games medalists in athletics
Athletes (track and field) at the 2005 Mediterranean Games